Fernando Martinuzzi (born 6 January 1980 in Avellaneda, Argentina) is an Argentinian/Italian soccer player. He is the goalkeeper of Real Garcilaso in the Peruvian Primera División.

Career 
Debuted in the Primera División Argentina in Club Atlético Lanús on 12 May 2002 against Argentinos Juniors. Later he emigrated to Colombia playing in the Unión Magdalena of the Categoría Primera A.

In 2006, Martinuzzi went to Peru's Sport Boys of Callao in the Peruvian Primera División.

On 21 August 2011 he renewed his contract with Latina playing on the Italian Lega Pro.

Then he went through clubs like Cienciano, Los Caimanes, Club Deportivo Universidad César Vallejo and Real Garcilaso, all of the Peruvian Primera División.

Clubs

Youth Honors

Professional Honors

References 

Argentine footballers
Club Atlético Lanús footballers
Juan Aurich footballers
Latina Calcio 1932 players
Cienciano footballers
Expatriate footballers in Colombia
Expatriate footballers in Peru
Argentine Primera División players
Peruvian Primera División players
Argentine expatriate footballers
1980 births
Living people
Association football goalkeepers
Sportspeople from Avellaneda